Kosi Trevor David Thompson (born January 27, 2003) is a Canadian soccer player who plays as a midfielder for Toronto FC in Major League Soccer.

Early life
He began playing soccer with in the Vaughan Azzurri youth system. In February 2015, at age 12, he joined the Toronto FC Academy. As part of the TFC Academy, he helped them to the 2019 U16 Dallas Cup and was named to the 2019-20 Generation Adidas Best XI. In 2020, he signed a national letter of intent to attend Oregon State University and play for the Beavers men's soccer team for the 2021 season. However, he ultimately did not join Oregon State, turning professional instead. Thompson attended Ursula Franklin Academy.

Career
On May 13, 2021, he signed his first professional contract with Toronto FC II of USL League One to join the team for the 2021 season. He made his debut for Toronto FC II on May 22, 2021 against North Texas SC. He scored his first professional goal on June 2 against Union Omaha.

After impressing during 2022 preseason, he signed a contract with the first team Toronto FC. He made his first appearance for TFC as a late-game substitution against the Columbus Crew, on March 12, 2022. He started his first match on April 2 against New York City FC. He scored his first goal on April 9 against Real Salt Lake.

International career
In May 2022, Thompson was named to the 60-man provisional Canadian U-20 team for the 2022 CONCACAF U-20 Championship.

Career statistics

Club

Honours
Toronto FC
Canadian Championship: 2020

References

2003 births
Living people
Canadian soccer players
Association football midfielders
Soccer players from Toronto
Toronto FC players
Toronto FC II players
Vaughan Azzurri players
USL League One players
Major League Soccer players
Homegrown Players (MLS)